United States gubernatorial elections were held in 1892, in 32 states, concurrent with the House, Senate elections and presidential election, on November 8, 1892 (except in Alabama, Arkansas, Florida, Georgia, Louisiana, Maine, Rhode Island and Vermont, which held early elections).

In Florida, the gubernatorial election was held in October for the first time, having previously been held on the same day as federal elections.

Results

See also 
1892 United States elections

References

Notes

Bibliography 
 
 
 
 
 
 

 
November 1892 events